Marie Danse or Marie Destrée-Danse (February 19, 1866 – May 31, 1942) was a Belgian painter-etcher and the wife of the art historian and politician Jules Destrée.

Life and work

Danse was born in Brussels as the daughter of the painter-etcher Auguste Danse who was her first teacher. Her sister Louise Danse was also a painter-etcher who later became known for her etchings.

Marie's etching Massacre of the Innocents after Matteo di Giovanni da Siena, was included in the 1905 book Women Painters of the World.

She became a founding member of the Brussels graphic artist collective L’Estampe in 1906, along with her sister Louise. After her husband's death in 1936 she was instrumental in founding the Institut Jules Destrée in 1938 to promote the regional development of Wallonia. With their heritage, a museum was founded in the attic of the Town Hall of Charleroi called Musée Jules Destrée, which opened in 1988.

Gallery

References

Bibliography
 

1866 births
1942 deaths
Artists from Brussels
Belgian women painters
19th-century Belgian painters
20th-century Belgian painters
19th-century Belgian women artists
20th-century Belgian women artists